Kgari may refer to:
K'gari, an Indigenous name for Fraser Island, an island off the coast of Queensland, Australia
Kgari, a village in the African country Botswana
Bakwana Kgosidintsi Kgari, politician from Botswana